Eagle Cave is an onyx cave located near Blue River, Wisconsin, in Richland County, Wisconsin, United States. Eagle Cave is known as Wisconsin's largest onyx cave and was the first cave to be commercially owned and operated in Wisconsin. The cave was discovered in 1849 and opened to the public in 1938. It is a popular camping destination, especially during the fall, winter, and spring months, when youth group campers are allowed to camp inside the cave and participate in their cave exploratory program. The cave exploratory program has been operating since 1954.

References

External links
Eagle Cave

Caves of Wisconsin
Landforms of Richland County, Wisconsin
Show caves in the United States
Tourist attractions in Richland County, Wisconsin